Nomad is the fifth studio album by guitarist Jesse Cook. The album has guest appearances by Flora Purim and Kurt Neumann and Sam Llanas of the BoDeans.

Track listing
All songs written by Jesse Cook except where noted.

 "Prelude" – 1:45
 "Qadduka-i-Mayyas" (traditional, arr. Jesse Cook) – 3:21
 "Surrender" – 3:58
 "Early on Tuesday" – 3:51
 "Beloved" – 2:07
 "Waiting for Tide" – 5:41
 "Down Like Rain" – 3:37
 "Leila" – 3:44
 "Maybe" – 3:16
 "Nomad" (Jesse Cook, Simon Emmerson, James McNally) – 5:32
 "Worlds Away" – 4:39
 "Toca Orilla" (Jesse Cook/Alejandra Nuñez) – 4:21

References

2003 albums
Jesse Cook albums
Narada Productions albums